The Coin Act 1696 (8 & 9 Will. 3 c. 26) was an Act of the Parliament of England which made it high treason to make or possess equipment useful for counterfeiting coins. Its title was "An Act for the better preventing the counterfeiting the current Coin of this Kingdom." It was extended to cover Scotland by the Treason Act 1708.

Provisions
The Act came into effect on 15 May 1697. Section 1 made it treason to "knowingly make or mend, or begin or proceed to make or mend, or assist in the making or mending of" any stamp, mould or the like which could be used to make gold or silver coins current in the realm, or any tool which could be used to emboss letters or marks on the side of a coin. It was also treason to knowingly buy, hide or conceal, or have possession of such items "without lawful Authority or sufficient Excuse for that Purpose." Aiding or abetting such conduct was also treason.

Section 2 made it treason to "wittingly or knowingly convey or assist in the conveying" any of the items described in section 1 out of the Royal Mint without lawful authority. "Knowingly receiving, hiding or concealing the same" without lawful authority was also treason. This section differed from section 1 in that "sufficient Excuse" was not a defence.

Section 3 made it treason to mark the edges of any coin, whether the coin was current or not, or even a counterfeit coin (except if done by a person working in the Royal Mint).

Section 4 made it treason to colour or gild a coin, or anything resembling a coin, so as to make it resemble gold or silver.

Section 5 provided for the destruction of coin-producing machinery found in the possession of anyone not an employee of the Royal Mint.

Section 6 made it a felony to take counterfeit money, or to mix copper with silver. The penalty for this offence was death.

Section 7 stated that corruption of blood was not to apply to any of the offences under this Act.

Section 8 provided that trials under the act were to be conducted either in the Court of King's Bench or before the justices of oyer and terminer, the assizes, or the Court of General Gaol Delivery.

Section 9 required any prosecution for offences under the Act to begin within 3 months of the offence. This time limit was later amended to 6 months for offences under sections 1 and 3 (by the Assay of Plate Act 1702 (1 Ann. c. 3) and by the Perpetuation, etc., of Acts, 1708 (7 Ann. c. 25)).

The Act was originally a temporary one which was due to expire, but it was made perpetual by Perpetuation, etc., of Acts, 1708 (7 Ann. c. 25).

See also
High treason in the United Kingdom
Coin Acts 1572 and 1575
Coin Act 1732
Counterfeiting Coin Act 1741
Treason Act
Great Recoinage of 1696

External links
Text of the Act

1696 in law
1696 in England
Treason in England
Acts of the Parliament of England
Currency law in the United Kingdom